Love Is Not Pop is an album by El Perro del Mar. It was released in Sweden on 1 April 2009 and in the US on 20 October. The first single, "Change of Heart", was released on 23 February 2009.

Track listing
All songs written by Sarah Assbring, except where noted.

 "Gotta Get Smart" - 5:03
 "Change of Heart" - 5:08
 "L Is for Love" - 4:32
 "Let Me In" - 3:02
 "Heavenly Arms" (Lou Reed) - 5:37
 "It Is Something (To Have Wept)" (lyrics by G. K. Chesterton) - 5:10
 "A Better Love" - 4:24

References

2009 albums
El Perro del Mar albums